Fairlop is a London Underground station in Fairlop in east London, England, which is on the Central line of the London Underground. It has been in Travelcard Zone 4 since 2 January 2007. It is on the north side of Forest Road, in Fairlop, just north of Barkingside.

History
The station was opened on 1 May 1903 as part of the Great Eastern Railway's (GER) Woodford to Ilford "loop" or branch line (the Fairlop Loop). This line, designed to stimulate suburban growth, had a chequered career. As a consequence of the 1921 Railways Act, the GER was merged with other railway companies in 1923 to become part of the London and North Eastern Railway (LNER).  As part of the 1935 – 1940 New Works Programme of the London Passenger Transport Board, the majority of the loop was to be transferred to form the eastern extensions of the Central line. Although work commenced in 1938, it was suspended on the outbreak of the Second World War in 1939 and work only recommenced in 1946.

Steam train services serving Fairlop were suspended on 29 November 1947 and electrified Central line passenger services, to Central London via Gants Hill, finally commenced on 31 May 1948. The line from Newbury Park to Hainault through Fairlop had been electrified for empty train movements to the new depot at Hainault from 14 December 1947.

Few alterations took place during this transfer, and the station remains a fine example of an Edwardian railway station including canopies that still bear the GER symbol in the bracketry.

The station has toilet facilities, a car park, and a waiting room on both westbound and eastbound platforms.

Connections
London Buses route 462 serves the station.

Gallery

References

External links

 London Transport Museum Photographic Archive
 
 
 

Central line (London Underground) stations
London Underground Night Tube stations
Tube stations in the London Borough of Redbridge
Former Great Eastern Railway stations
Railway stations in Great Britain opened in 1903
William Neville Ashbee railway stations